Rhadley Brawa is a Papua New Guinean professional rugby league footballer who played for the PNG Hunters in the Queensland Cup. He has played representative football for Papua New Guinea.

References

Living people
Papua New Guinean rugby league players
Papua New Guinea Hunters players
Papua New Guinea national rugby league team players
Year of birth missing (living people)
Rugby articles needing expert attention